The 1961 Big Ten Conference football season was the 66th season of college football played by the member schools of the Big Ten Conference and was a part of the 1961 NCAA University Division football season.

The 1961 Ohio State Buckeyes football team, under head coach Woody Hayes, compiled an 8–0–1, won the Big Ten championship, and was recognized as the national champion by the Football Writers Association of America. Fullback Bob Ferguson was a consensus first-team All-American and won the Maxwell Award and the UPI and Sporting News College Football Player of the Year awards.

The 1961 Minnesota Golden Gophers football team, under head coach Murray Warmath, compiled an 8–2, was ranked No. 6 in the final AP Poll, and defeated UCLA in the 1962 Rose Bowl. Quarterback Sandy Stephens was a consensus first-team All-American and won the Chicago Tribune Silver Football award as the Big Ten's most valuable player.  As of 2017, Stephens is the most recent Minnesota player to win the award.

Ron Miller of Wisconsin received the Sammy Baugh Trophy as the nation's top collegiate passer.

Season overview

Results and team statistics

Key
AP final = Team's rank in the final AP Poll of the 1961 season
AP high = Team's highest rank in the AP Poll throughout the 1961 season
PPG = Average of points scored per game
PAG = Average of points allowed per game
MVP = Most valuable player as voted by players on each team as part of the voting process to determine the winner of the Chicago Tribune Silver Football trophy; trophy winner in bold

Preseason
On November 20, 1960, hours after the final game of the 1960 season, Iowa announced that Forest Evashevski would be replaced as head football coach by Jerry Burns.  Evashevski remained at Iowa as the athletic director. Burns, who signed a three-year contract, had been an assistant coach under Evashevski since 1954 and had played at Michigan from 1947 to 1950.

In the preseason AP Poll, Iowa was ranked No. 1, and Ohio State was No. 2.

Regular season

Bowl games

Post-season developments
There were no changes in the conference's head football coaches between the 1961 and 1962 seasons.

Statistical leaders

The Big Ten's individual statistical leaders for the 1961 season include the following:

Passing yards

Rushing yards

Receiving yards

Total yards

Scoring

Awards and honors

All-Big Ten honors

The following players were picked by the Associated Press (AP) and/or the United Press International (UPI) as first-team players on the 1961 All-Big Ten Conference football team.

All-American honors

At the end of the 1961 season, Big Ten players secured two of the 11 consensus first-team picks for the 1961 College Football All-America Team. The Big Ten's consensus All-Americans were:

Other Big Ten players who were named first-team All-Americans by at least one selector were:

Other awards

Ohio State fullback Bob Ferguson won the Maxwell Award and the UPI and Sporting News College Football Player of the Year awards. He finished second in the voting for the Heisman Trophy behind Ernie Davis.

Ron Miller of Wisconsin received the Sammy Baugh Trophy as the nation's top collegiate passer. He was the first Big Ten player to receive the award.

1962 NFL Draft
The following Big Ten players were among the first 100 picks in the 1962 NFL Draft:

References